The Tour of Hainan is an annual professional road bicycle racing stage race held in Hainan Province, China. The race consists of nine stages and is part of the UCI Asia Tour. The event was first held in 2006. It was made a UCI 2.1 race from 2007 and upgraded to category 2.HC in 2009. The race was due to be part of the new UCI ProSeries in 2020, but the race was cancelled due to the COVID-19 pandemic.

Past winners

Statistics

Victories per country

References

External links
 
 
 Statistics at the-sports.org
 Tour of Hainan at cqranking.com

 
Cycle races in China
UCI Asia Tour races
Sport in Hainan
Recurring sporting events established in 2006
2006 establishments in China
Autumn events in China